Broke is the surname of:

 Charles Broke Vere (1779–1843), né Broke, English army officer at the time of the Napoleonic Wars
 David Broke or Brooke (c.1498–1560), English judge and Member of Parliament
 George Broke (born 1946), British Army officer, equerry to the Queen
 Philip Broke (1776–1841), Royal Navy officer
 Philip Broke, 2nd Baronet (1804–1855), Royal Navy officer, of the Broke-Middleton baronets
 Richard Broke (judge) (died 1529), English judge
 Robert Broke (died 1558), British justice, politician and legal writer
 Simon Broke (fl.1393–1406), English politician
 Thomas Broke or Brooke (fl.1550), British translator, alderman of Calais
 William Broke, English 16th-century college and university head